Grant is a city in Washington County, Minnesota, and a suburb of St. Paul. The population was 4,096 at the time of the 2010 census.

History
The city was named for Maj. Gen. Ulysses S. Grant.

Geography
Minnesota State Highways 36 and 96 are two of the main routes in the community.

Demographics

2010 census
As of the census of 2010, there were 4,096 people, 1,464 households, and 1,235 families residing in the city. The racial makeup of the city was 96.7% White, 0.2% African American, 0.3% Native American, 1.8% Asian, 0.3% from other races, and 0.6% from two or more races. Hispanic or Latino of any race were 1.8% of the population.

There were 1,464 households, of which 33.3% had children under the age of 18 living with them, 76.8% were married couples living together, 4.8% had a female householder with no husband present, 2.7% had a male householder with no wife present, and 15.6% were non-families. 12.8% of all households were made up of individuals, and 5.1% had someone living alone who was 65 years of age or older. The average household size was 2.79 and the average family size was 3.05.

The median age in the city was 47.7 years. 23.7% of residents were under the age of 18; 6.5% were between the ages of 18 and 24; 14.4% were from 25 to 44; 40.6% were from 45 to 64; and 14.8% were 65 years of age or older. The gender makeup of the city was 50.8% male and 49.2% female.

2000 census
As of the census of 2000, there were 4,026 people, 1,374 households, and 1,215 families residing there. The racial makeup of the city was 98.14% White, 0.15% African American, 0.07% Native American, 0.89% Asian, 0.45% from other races, and 0.30% from two or more races. Hispanic or Latino of any race were 1.19% of the population.

There were 1,374 households, out of which 39.9% had children under the age of 18 living with them, 82.6% were married couples living together, 3.6% had a female householder with no husband present, and 11.5% were non-families. 9.1% of all households were made up of individuals, and 3.0% had someone living alone who was 65 years of age or older. The average household size was 2.93 and the average family size was 3.11.

In the city, the population was spread out, with 28.1% under the age of 18, 5.3% from 18 to 24, 24.3% from 25 to 44, 34.2% from 45 to 64, and 8.1% who were 65 years of age or older. The median age was 42 years. For every 100 females, there were 104.9 males. For every 100 females age 18 and over, there were 100.6 males.

The median income for a household in the city was $98,228, and the median income for a family was $104,601. Males had a median income of $65,441 versus $38,895 for females. The per capita income for the city was $44,486. About 1.7% of families and 1.8% of the population were below the poverty line, including 1.3% of those under age 18 and 9.5% of those age 65 or over.

See also
Withrow, Minnesota

References

Cities in Minnesota
Cities in Washington County, Minnesota